Phytoecia coeruleomicans is a species of beetle in the family Cerambycidae. It was described by Stephan von Breuning in 1946.

References

Phytoecia
Beetles described in 1946